Alejandro Molina (born 21 July 1988) is a former Mexican footballer, who last played for Dorados de Sinaloa. He was earlier under investigation for an incident occurred in a parking lot of a bar.

Club career

Club Tijuana
In 2009, Molina was loaned to Veracruz because the lack of games played. In 2010, he was loaned again, but now to Club Tijuana Xoloitzcuintles De Caliente. In 2010, he helped Tijuana obtain the Apertura 2010 champions. Then on May 21, 2011, his team advanced to the Primera División.

Dorados de Sinaloa
Molina played for Dorados de Sinaloa, and helped the team win the Ascenso MX and were promoted to first division.

Club Necaxa
For the Apertura 2015–16, Molina was loaned from Monterrey to Ascenso MX team, Club Necaxa.
On 15 August 2015, Molina and teammate Luis Gorocito were arrested and taken to prison, after being involved in a fight in a parking lot bar that same night.
On August 16, Club Necaxa announced that they have suspended both players for an unlimited time until the problem had been solved. Media reported that the players could face up to 8 years in prison.

Atlético Ensenada
On 17 July 2020, Molina joined Atlético Ensenada from the Liga de Balompié Mexicano.

Career statistics

A.  The "Other" column constitutes appearances and goals (including substitutes) in the 2012–13 CONCACAF Champions League.

Titles

References

1988 births
Living people
Association football defenders
C.F. Monterrey players
C.D. Veracruz footballers
Club Tijuana footballers
Correcaminos UAT footballers
C.F. Mérida footballers
Dorados de Sinaloa footballers
Club Necaxa footballers
Liga MX players
Ascenso MX players
Footballers from Baja California
Mexican footballers
People from Ensenada, Baja California